Frank Robert Donald "Ribs" Raney (born Raniszewski, February 16, 1923 – July 7, 2003) was an American professional baseball player, a right-handed pitcher who appeared in four Major League games for the St. Louis Browns during the – seasons.

Raney attended Western Michigan University. His playing career lasted for ten season, 1941–1943 and 1946–1952. He missed both 1944 and 1945 while serving in the United States Navy in World War II.

His MLB career consisted of three starting assignments at the tail end of the 1949 season, and one relief appearance during the opening weeks of 1950.  On October 1, 1949, he earned his only big-league victory, hurling a complete game, 8–6 triumph over the Chicago White Sox at Sportsman's Park. Raney prevailed despite allowing ten hits, six bases on balls, and five earned runs.

All told, in 18 Major League innings pitched, he gave up 25 hits and 14 walks, with seven strikeouts.

Raney pitched in 268 minor league games, most of them in the Browns' farm system.

References

External links

1923 births
2003 deaths
Baseball players from Michigan
Birmingham Barons players
Elmira Pioneers players
Huntington Jewels players
Little Rock Travelers players
Major League Baseball pitchers
Oklahoma City Indians players
Paragould Browns players
St. Louis Browns players
Toledo Mud Hens players
Toronto Maple Leafs (International League) players
United States Navy personnel of World War II